E3 ubiquitin-protein ligase HUWE1 is an enzyme that in humans is encoded by the HUWE1 gene.

It performs the third step (ligation) in binding ubiquitin to proteins in a process called ubiquitination which tags the proteins for disposal.

Human genetic studies that implicate HUWE1 in intellectual disability. Additional research suggests HUWE1 has implications in cancer research.

References

Further reading

External links 
 
 International HUWE1 Community: www.huwe1.org
 Louie's HUWE - a US 501c3 nonprofit to support people with HUWE1-related genetic conditions: www.huwe1.org/louieshuwe